The Chrysler Fifth Avenue was a trim level/option package or model name used by Chrysler for its larger sedans from 1979 to 1993.  The Fifth Avenue name was no longer used after 1993 when Chrysler introduced its new LH-platform New Yorker and similar LHS. The title "Fifth Avenue" references a street in New York City which contains many upscale shops and cultural attractions. The Chrysler Building is two blocks east of Fifth Avenue.

In 1980, realizing that they needed to offer a comparable luxury sedan to the Cadillac Fleetwood and Lincoln Town Car, Chrysler offered the Fifth Avenue trim package as an option on the R-body New Yorker. 

In 1982, further downsizing put the New Yorker model on the M-body platform, with a Fifth Avenue package available. In 1983, to distinguish the M-body New Yorker from the new AE-body New Yorker, the Fifth Avenue name was added to the M-body, so it became the one-year-only New Yorker Fifth Avenue. In 1984, the M-body Chrysler was simply the Fifth Avenue, a name it kept through 1989. The AE New Yorker morphed into the AC body New Yorker in 1988, although all 3 New Yorker models were offered that year (AE New Yorker Turbo, AC New Yorker, and M-body Fifth Avenue). 

After the discontinuance of the M-body in mid-1989, Chrysler offered an even smaller Fifth Avenue on the AC platform in 1990, which ran through 1993. 

In 1994, a new LH-body New Yorker appeared, as did a companion LH Chrysler, the LHS,  in 1996. The New Yorker bowed out after 1997, and was not replaced until the 2005 Chrysler 300 LX.  The LHS was discontinued after 2004, and was not replaced.

Origin and the "R-Body years"

The Fifth Avenue name was first used in 1979 on an upmarket sub-model of the R-body Chrysler New Yorker sedan. This generation of Chrysler, although already smaller than its maximum size of the previous 1978 Series CS, remained V8-powered and rear wheel drive. The R-body rode on a  wheelbase, which was similar to the downsized Cadillac and Lincoln competitors. 

For 1979, ordering the New Yorker Fifth Avenue Edition package got the buyer a car finished in only two-tone "Designer's Cream-on-Beige" exterior paint, with matching Champagne leather interior and lighter-toned "driftwood" woodgrain dash appliques and a unique "Pentastar" hood ornament. There was a standard landau vinyl roof, and somewhat unusual fixed quarter windows which were integrated with the rear doors, while the body style was a "pillared hardtop", leaving the doors without metal frames around the windows. Added to the upper door frame surrounding the fixed quarter windows was a courtesy light above a leather door handle while a entry footlight was installed in the lower portion of the door. 

The package was so thoroughly color-keyed that even the bumper rub strips were beige. The R-body Fifth Avenues ran for three years, although additional Fifth Avenue colors were added for 1980 and 1981. The concealed headlights were a styling feature that carried over from the discontinued Imperial LeBaron and the Chrysler New Yorker Brougham that briefly replaced the marque. The listed retail price of the New Yorker was $8,631 ($ in  dollars ) and the Fifth Avenue trim package added $1,500 extra ($ in  dollars ). The front suspension continued to offer Chryslers signature, but antiquated, longitudinal front torsion bars, called Torsion-Aire, and anti-sway bar with a solid rear limited-slip differential connected to leaf springs which was introduced on the 1957 Series C-76.

To add to its exclusivity, Chrysler offered "Convenience and Appearance Options". The list offered Open Road Handling Package, Two-Tone Paint, interior lighting, air conditioning with an upgraded climate control feature, rear window defroster, cruise control, power adjustable front seat, power windows, power electric door locks, power trunk release, luxury appearance steering wheel with an extra cost leather wrapped feature, digital clock, locking gas cap, lighting and mirrors, halogen headlamps, cornering lamps, electric adjustable outside sideview mirrors, several AM/FM radio or separate stereo radio choices to include CB and 8-track cassette player, power electric extendable antenna, various vinyl side moldings and bumper guards, undercoating, color keyed seat belts, wheel covers, and aluminum wheels, all at extra cost.

For 1980 a second exterior color was offered called "Black Walnut" metallic, an simulated alligator grained padded landau vinyl roof in matching Black Walnut with gold accent body side stripes while the interior color remained only as Champagne leather interior.

The 1981 Fifth Avenues added two new exterior colors, while the Fifth Avenue trim package was now $2,092 ($ in  dollars ) to the $10,459 retail price ($ in  dollars ).  The new colors offered "Mahogany Starmist" and "Heather Mist" exterior paint with gold pinstriping with a matching Mahogany Landau roof with the Mahogany interior offering Heather cloth or leather, or "Nightwatch Blue" with "Heather Mist", the same color treatment on the Landau roof, with Dark Blue interior pieces instead of Mahogany. Corduroy cloth upholstery was available in Heather or Cashmere, while the leather added Dark Blue and Mahogany to the Heather and Cashmere color choices with matching dashboard, door panels and carpeting. No coupe was offered and instead Chrysler reintroduced the Imperial nameplate as a coupe only, and the Fifth Avenue shared an appearance with the Series YS Imperial coupe.

The underlying technology, consisting of engine, transmission chassis, suspension and drivetrain was shared with all full-sized R-body vehicles sold as Dodge and Plymouth products, while the exclusivity of the Chrysler name added sound insulation, color selections and more sound system choices. Overall production of the R-body New Yorkers was low (less than 75,000 from 1979 through 1981) and Fifth Avenue production was approximately 25% of them.  14 were stretched into limousines and several were provided for use during the 1980 Winter Olympics in Lake Placid, NY. The others were loaned to Hollywood movie studios. During this time the Early 1980s recession in the United States began to take effect and impact sales.

North American luxury sedans began to experience competition from imported European marques, like the Mercedes-Benz S-Class, BMW 7 Series, and the Jaguar XJ which offered standard equipment like fuel injection, responsive engine performance and heightened levels of luxury appearance and equipment.

Japanese marques introduced the Toyota Cressida and the Nissan Maxima offering luxurious appearances, high levels of formerly optional equipment as standard and fuel efficiency for a modest price.

ASC LeBaron Fifth Avenue

For 1980 only, a Fifth Avenue package was created by ASC (American Sunroof Corporation) for the Chrysler LeBaron, which shared its Chrysler M platform with the Dodge Diplomat. This rare option package, produced on 654 LeBarons for the year, included many of the exterior features found on the New Yorker Fifth Avenue on a shorter wheelbase.

1982–1989: The M-body years

For model year 1982, the R-body line was discontinued and the New Yorker nameplate transferred to the smaller M-body line. Up to this point, the Chrysler M-body entry had been sold as LeBaron, but that name was moved to a new K-car based FWD line. Following the nameplate swap, the M-body line was consolidated and simplified. 360 V8 engines were gone, as were coupes and station wagons (the K-car LeBaron's coupe and wagon replaced them).

The Fifth Avenue option was still available as a $1,244 package ($ in  dollars ) to the listed retail price of $10,851 ($ in  dollars ). It was adapted from the earlier LeBaron's package, with a distinctive vinyl roof, electro-luminescent opera lamps, and a rear fascia adapted from the Dodge Diplomat, albeit modified. Interiors featured button-tufted, pillow-soft seats covered in either "Kimberley velvet" or "Corinthian leather", choices that would continue unchanged throughout the car's run.  In addition, the carpet was thicker than that offered in the base New Yorker, Diplomat and Gran Fury/Caravelle Salon, and the interior had more chrome trim. The Fifth Avenue option also included illuminated entry, AM/FM stereo with a rear amplifier, power door locks, power 6-way driver's seat, power antenna, remote trunk release, dual side mirrors, full undercoating, passenger vanity mirror, tape stripes, locking wire wheel covers, as well as a standard 5.2L (318 in³) V8 engine.

The colors offered were expanded from the previous generations exclusivity, offering Goldenrod Crystal Coat, Nightwatch Blue, Charcoal Gray metallic, Formal Black, Morocco Red, Sterling Silver Crystal, Mahogany metallic, and Pearl White.

1982 was the last year for the optional AM/FM 8-track stereo, and AM/FM stereo with integrated CB. The exterior of a Fifth Avenue Edition New Yorker can be identified from a regular New Yorker by the following: opera lights, hood stripes, and Fifth Avenue Edition badges on the rear door window filler panels—New Yorkers bore "New Yorker" badges.

In another confusing name swap, the New Yorker name was now used for another new extended K-car line in 1983, the E-body New Yorker. The larger M-body car was now called New Yorker Fifth Avenue to distinguish it from the E-body. 1983 was the last year M-bodies were made in Canada and the last year for the optional "Chronometer" glovebox-mounted clock, the 225 Slant-six six-cylinder engine, and all analog tuned radios and chrome-trimmed pedals.

For 1984, the car was simply called Fifth Avenue, setting the name that would continue for six successful years.  The Fifth Avenue (and its Dodge and Plymouth siblings) would prove to be the last V8-powered, rear wheel drive Chrysler vehicles until the Chrysler 300 was revived in that configuration for 2005.

All Fifth Avenues from 1984 to 1989 were powered by a  V8 engine, mated to Chrysler's well-known Torqueflite three-speed automatic transmission.  As this was the largest Chrysler model available, sales took off, especially during 1985–1986, when over 100,000 were made each year.

Starting with the 1984 models, Fifth Avenue production was moved from Windsor, Ontario to St. Louis, Missouri. Beginning in mid-1987 through mid 1989 model year, they were manufactured at the American Motors plant in Kenosha, Wisconsin which had been purchased by Chrysler in 1987.

The Fifth Avenue also far outsold its Dodge Diplomat and Plymouth Gran Fury siblings, with a much greater proportion of sales going to private customers, despite its higher price tag. Production peaked at 118,000 cars for 1986 and the Fifth Avenue stood out in a by-now K-car dominated lineup as Chrysler's lone concession to traditional RWD American sedans.

Some of the changes to the M-body Fifth Avenue through the years included:
 1984 - New Yorker badge replaced by Fifth Avenue badge on trunklid; "Fifth Avenue Edition" badge continues on the rear doors, a new steering wheel was added. The regular Pentastar was replaced by a crystal one and was now used on the hood ornament and steering wheel (this would continue through 1989). Wiper arms were now black (instead of silver). Engine blocks were also now painted black (previous ones were painted light blue) Optional 10-spoke alloy "Road Wheels" were replaced with new optional "Snowflake" alloy wheels. New upholstery, and new exterior colors (most in base/clear) appeared.
 1985 - New black gearshift knob introduced (1982 to 1984 models have chromed knobs). Turn signal lever is now also black (1984 and below models were interior color keyed) with the exception of models with two-tone paint. A revised 5.2 L V8 now had a roller camshaft, swirl-port heads, and a carburetor changed from a two-barrel Carter to a two-barrel Holley. This increased horsepower from 130 to 140 and torque was also increased to 265 lb-ft (from 230). California models now also came with the Holley 6280 2bbl carb.
 1986 - New-style ignition key and center high-mounted stop lamp (the latter a federal mandate) introduced. Models with two-tone paint had lower roof lines. 
 1987 - New steering wheel; final year for optional alloy wheels, two-tone paint, and rear stereo amplifier were offered. Also the last year for 17-ounce deep-pile carpeting and the last year the radio, headlight switch and climate control panels were silver.
 1988 - Vinyl roof restyled; lower edge of sail panel covering extended below chrome window sill moldings. "Fifth Avenue Edition" badge replaced by a crystal Pentastar surrounded by a gold wreath which in 1990 would reappear on the Imperial. Driver's side seat now had a manual recliner (previous models had 6-way power adjusters, but no recliner). Front headrests were more cushioned. The piping around the seats was now stitched material rather than the plastic in previous years.  New radios. Door panels are restyled and new power mirrors are standard. Passenger side dash vents were now interior color-keyed (instead of black with chrome trim). A new overhead console with map lamps, compass/temperature display and sunglasses storage became available.  A driver SRS with padded knee bolster affixed below the instrument panel became optional in May.
 1989 - Final year of production. Driver's side airbag is standard.  At the time the Fifth Avenue (as well as its M body twins) was one of the only cars that offered an airbag with a tilt steering wheel. Many optional features were made standard. 

During the years 1982 to 1988, approximately 60 of these cars were stretched into limousines by various coach companies.

Production Figures/Base Prices

Production figures for Fifth Avenue were as follows:

1982 - 50,509 1983 - 83,501   1984 - 79,441   1985 - 109,971   1986 -104,744   1987 - 70,579   1988 - 43,486   1989 - 26,883

Base prices were as follows-(all in USD):

1982 - $10,851 ($ in  dollars ) 1983 - $12,487 ($ in  dollars ) 1984 - $13,990 ($ in  dollars ) 1985 - $13,978 ($ in  dollars )  1986 - $14,910 ($ in  dollars )  1987 - $15,422 ($ in  dollars )  1988 - $17,243 ($ in  dollars )  1989 - $18,345 ($ in  dollars )

1990–1993: New Yorker Fifth Avenue 

1990 saw the previous relationship between New Yorker and Fifth Avenue return, as the Fifth Avenue became a model of the New Yorker. There was some substantive difference, however, as the New Yorker Fifth Avenue used a slightly longer chassis than the standard car. The new New Yorker Fifth Avenue's larger interior volume classified it as a full-size model this time; despite having smaller exterior dimensions than the first generation. 1990 also saw the return of hidden headlamps which when off were concealed behind retractable metal covers. Hidden headlamps had not been available since the 1981 R-body New Yorker Fifth Avenue.

The New Yorker Fifth Avenue's famous seats, long noted for their button-tufted appearance and sofa-like comfort, continued to be offered with the customer's choice of velour or leather, with the former "Corinthian leather" replaced by that of the Mark Cross Company. Leather-equipped cars bore the Mark Cross logo on the seats and, externally, on an emblem attached to the brushed aluminum band ahead of the rear door opera windows.

For 1990, Chrysler's new 3.3-liter V6 engine was the standard and only choice, teamed with the company's A-604 four-speed electronic automatic transaxle.  Beginning in 1991, a larger 3.8-liter V-6 became optional.  It delivered the same 147 horsepower as the 3.3, but had more torque.

For the 1992 model year, the New Yorker Fifth Avenue (along with the New Yorker Salon) were restyled with a more rounded-off appearance front and rear.

All New Yorker Fifth Avenues of this generation were covered by Chrysler's market-leading "Crystal Key Owner Care Program" which included a 5-year/50,000-mile limited warranty and 7-year/70,000-mile powertrain warranty. A 24-hour toll-free customer service hotline was also provided.

The Fifth Avenue name was discontinued at the end of the 1993 model year when the New Yorker was replaced by the redesigned, longer, and more aerodynamic 1994 New Yorker and similar LHS.

Base prices
1990 - $20,860 ($ in  dollars )
1991 - $20,875 ($ in  dollars )
1992 - $21,874 ($ in  dollars )
1993 - $22,048 ($ in  dollars )

All prices listed are in USD.

In popular culture 
Jonathan Banks' character Mike Ehrmantraut in the TV shows Breaking Bad and Better Call Saul drives a 1988 Chrysler Fifth Avenue.

References

External links

Rear wheel drive Fifth Avenue many details page
Front wheel drive Fifth Avenue page

Fifth Avenue
Front-wheel-drive vehicles
Full-size vehicles
Rear-wheel-drive vehicles
Sedans
1980s cars
1990s cars
Cars introduced in 1982
Luxury vehicles
Cars discontinued in 1993